The following is a list of emo pop studio albums by notable artists that have been described as such by music reviews, or any similar source. They are listed in chronological order.

1990s

2000s

2010s

2020s

References
 Citations

Sources

 

 
 
Emo pop